Terminalia archipelagi is a species of plant in the Combretaceae family.

It is endemic to the islands of the Bismarck Archipelago, within Papua New Guinea.

It is threatened by habitat loss.

References

archipelagi
Endemic flora of Papua New Guinea
Trees of Papua New Guinea
Bismarck Archipelago
Endangered flora of Oceania
Taxonomy articles created by Polbot